Peter Segal (born 1962) is an American film director, producer, screenwriter, and actor. Segal has directed the comedic films Tommy Boy (1995), My Fellow Americans (1996), The Nutty Professor II: The Klumps (2000), Anger Management (2003), 50 First Dates (2004), The Longest Yard (2005), Get Smart (2008), Grudge Match (2013), and My Spy (2020).

Early life and education
Segal grew up in New York City, where his father was head of publicity at MGM.  In the 1970s, Segal and his family moved to Los Angeles.  Segal attended the University of Southern California, where he double majored in Broadcast Journalism and English.

Segal graduated from the USC School of Cinema and Television.

Career
Segal began his career writing and directing television.  In 2002, he created the NBC sitcom Hidden Hills (2002–2003). In 1995, he formed his production company, Callahan Filmworks, along with long-time producing partner Michael Ewing.

Segal made his feature film directorial debut in 1994 with Naked Gun 33 1/3: The Final Insult, starring Leslie Nielsen and George Kennedy.

Segal went on to direct Chris Farley in Tommy Boy (1995).  The film also stars David Spade, and it is considered a "now-iconic cult classic."

Segal directed the comedy film My Fellow Americans (1996), starring Jack Lemmon, James Garner and Lauren Bacall.

Segal directed the comedy Nutty Professor II: The Klumps (2000), starring Eddie Murphy.

Segal directed Adam Sandler for the first time in Anger Management (2003), which also starred Jack Nicholson.  When asked by the BBC who was the most famous person in his contacts book, Segal replied, "I have to say, it's very obvious now, it's Jack Nicholson. I've kept his number on my speed dial just so I can show it to friends. I could call him up out of the blue, but I'm worried he might say 'Pete who?'"

Segal collaborated with Sandler again in 50 First Dates (2004), which also starred Drew Barrymore.

Segal collaborated with Sandler for the third time in The Longest Yard (2005), a remake of the 1974 film of the same name. The film has become the second highest grossing sports comedy in history.

After directing three of Sandler's films, Segal's next film became Get Smart (2008).  It is an adaptation of the '60s television series of the same name that was created by Mel Brooks and Buck Henry.  Segal stated in an interview with AMC that he loved the show so much as a kid.  The film starred Steve Carell, Anne Hathaway, Dwayne Johnson, Alan Arkin and Terence Stamp.

Segal also directed Grudge Match (2013), which starred Robert De Niro, Sylvester Stallone, Kevin Hart, Alan Arkin, Kim Basinger and Jon Bernthal.

Personal life
When asked in a September 2014 interview by the BBC if he believes in God, Segal replied: "I do. I'm very spiritual and I'm Jewish by faith. I'm not a practising Jew, I'm more of a recreational Jew. I celebrate the holidays and I try to inform my kids about their heritage because I think we all at some point have to defend our heritage and if they get picked on I want them to know why."

Filmography

Film

Acting credits

Television

TV movies

TV specials

References

External links

1962 births
American male film actors
American film directors
American film producers
American male screenwriters
Comedy film directors
Living people
Place of birth missing (living people)